Jihed Jaballah (born 29 July 1989) is a Tunisian handball player who plays for Dunkerque HGL and the Tunisian national team.

He participated at the 2017 World Men's Handball Championship.

References

1989 births
Living people
Tunisian male handball players
Expatriate handball players in Turkey
Tunisian expatriate sportspeople in Turkey
People from Sousse
IFK Kristianstad players
Competitors at the 2013 Mediterranean Games
Competitors at the 2018 Mediterranean Games
Competitors at the 2022 Mediterranean Games
Mediterranean Games silver medalists for Tunisia
Mediterranean Games medalists in handball
20th-century Tunisian people
21st-century Tunisian people